Vigor is a given name and a surname. It may refer to:

 Saint Vigor (died 537), French bishop, missionary and saint
 Vigor or Victor Boucquet (1619–1677), Flemish painter
 Vigor Bovolenta (1974–2012), Italian volleyball player
 Eileen Vigor (born 1935), English retired cricketer and lawn bowler
 Jane Vigor (1699–1783), English letter writer from the Russian court 
 Michael Vigor (born 1990), Scottish-born Australian basketball player
 Xia Vigor (born 2009), British-Filipino child actress and TV host